El Rincón is a corregimiento in Santa María District, Herrera Province, Panama with a population of 1,712 as of 2010.

References

Corregimientos of Herrera Province